Erpis is a genus of moths of the family Crambidae. It was described by Francis Walker in 1863. It contains only one species, Erpis macularis, which is found on Borneo.

The forewings are whitish with a blackish discal spot and four blackish bands.

References

External links
 

Cybalomiinae
Crambidae genera
Taxa named by Francis Walker (entomologist)